The TeST TST-1 Alpin is a Czech shoulder-wing, single-seat, pusher configuration motor glider that was designed and produced by TeST.

Design and development
The TST-1 was the first motor glider in a long line of aircraft produced by the company. The design goals included that it should be economical to build and operate as well as easy to fly, with outstanding soaring capabilities with the engine shut down.

The aircraft has a wooden structure, with some fibreglass parts. The  span wing employs a Wortmann FX 61-184 airfoil. Both the wings and tail detached for transport or storage. The engine is mounted in pusher configuration in a faired pod on a short non-retractable strut, above and behind the cockpit. The landing gear is a rigidly-mounted monowheel gear.

When it was available the aircraft was available as plans, a standard 600 hour build-time kit, an "express-built" kit or as a complete ready-to-fly aircraft. Prices in 1998 were US$325 for the plans, US$9,840 for the standard kit and US$15,250 for the completed aircraft. In 1998 22 were reportedly flying.

Specifications (TST 1)

See also

References

External links
photo of TST-1

TST-1
1980s Czechoslovakian sailplanes
Homebuilt aircraft
Shoulder-wing aircraft
Single-engined pusher aircraft
Motor gliders